are a set of written bertsos (extemporaneous poems in Basque) written and published in Gipuzkoa (Basque Country, Spain) in 1838 during the last stage of the First Carlist War. During the war various bertso leaflets were published, promoting various factions, with some enjoying wide circulation and influence over public opinion across Basque language areas, the main Carlist stronghold.

The Muñagorri bertsos were issued by José Antonio Muñagorri's faction with the aim of creating a split within Carlos de Borbón's supporters and putting an end to the war, in exchange for keeping a reduced version of home rule in the Basque Country (peace and fueros). Muñagorri's influence on the ground was small, but his talks with the liberals in Madrid paved the way to the Embrace of Bergara (1839).

Text

While the whole version extends longer, the reduced, most widely known version is made up of six stanzas, and popularized in modern times by singer-songwriter Benito Lertxundi.
 *Top to bottom, left to right

References

External links
 "Muñagorriren bertsoak", rendered by Benito Lertxundi

1838 poems
First Carlist War
Basque-language poems
Works published anonymously
Political literature
War poetry
Songs based on poems